"Take a Breath" is a song written and recorded by David Gilmour, the former lead guitarist of the British rock band Pink Floyd. The song is included as the fourth track from his third studio album, On an Island. 

Gilmour co-wrote the track with his wife, Polly Samson. As he revealed during a promotional interview for the album with Matthew Evans, the lyrics for the song exploit the theme of water (which runs through the whole album) and, in this case, being pulled underwater and drowning - both intended as symbols of man's mortality.

Along with "This Heaven", also on On an Island, it was released in the US as a promotional CD-R in October 2006. The song was performed live during Gilmour's 2006 On an Island tour, although it was performed in a different order to the album, played as the eighth song in the album set instead of fourth.

In 2007, the song was released in special promotional 7" singles, along with selected songs from On an Island, such as "Smile", "This Heaven", "A Pocketful of Stones", and "On an Island"

Track listing

References

David Gilmour songs
Songs written by David Gilmour
Songs with lyrics by Polly Samson
Song recordings produced by David Gilmour
Song recordings produced by Chris Thomas (record producer)